Red Wing High School is a liberal arts, public high school located in the Mississippi River Valley, 50 miles southeast of the Minneapolis/St. Paul metropolitan area, United States. The school is part of the Red Wing Independent School District (ISD 256) and serves as the high school for Red Wing, Minnesota and its surrounding communities.

History
The school has a history dating back to 1886, the year that Red Wing built its first public high school.

Central High School (19191995) 
Constructed in 1919, the historic Central High, located on East Avenue, functioned as a school.  In 1995 the city of Red Wing built the new Red Wing High School on the southeast side of town.

Red Wing High School (1995present) 
From 1995 to 2010 Red Wing High School served grades 912th with 8th grade housed at Twin Bluff Middle School. Due to increased enrollment in younger grades and space needs within the district, in Fall of 2010, 8th grade was moved to the High School. The building now serves students in grades 812.

Features include flexible team learning areas, a multi-station "food court," and common staff planning areas. A full size greenhouse and one of its kind Minnesota Department of Natural Resources-licensed Aquaculture Facility play host to plant science and agricultural courses. The Hovda Auditorium seats 732 people and supports concerts and community events. The Little Theatre allows seating for 250 and hosts smaller productions.

The top load gymnasium offers three teaching stations. The weights room is available for physical education instruction and sports training. The sports complex includes a football stadium, eight tennis courts, three baseball fields, four softball fields, soccer fields, a nine-lane all-weather running track and field event areas. The district also owns an indoor ice skating facility, Prairie Island Arena.

Academics
RWHS operates on a 7-class schedule.s. Courses may be taking through the following areas:

 Agricultural Science
 Art
 Business
 Cooperative Education Program
 Family and Consumer Science
 Health/ Physical Education
 Industrial Technology Education
 Language Arts
 Mathematics
 Music
 Science
 Social Studies
 World Language
 Individual Credit Program (IEP Required)

Course Offerings
Each course is 18 weeks in length and earns one-half credit toward graduation, unless otherwise stated. Although most courses are a semester in length and generate a one-half
credit, some courses are designed for a full year and generate a full credit.

Academic Assessment
The Basic Skills Tests (BST) have been replaced by the Minnesota Comprehensive Assessments (MCA-IIs) in a continued effort to develop a more rigorous K-12 education system. The MCA-IIs were created to help schools and districts measure student progress in mastering the state's new reading, writing and mathematics standards.

Students' performance on these statewide assessments can be used as one of multiple criteria to determine grade promotion or retention. To graduate, students will have to pass the MCA-II writing test given in grade nine, the MCA-II reading test given in grade ten and the MCA-II math test given in grade eleven. All public schools and charter schools must administer the tests. Students must pass these required state exams, as well as successfully complete a required number of course credits and any local graduation requirements to graduate from a Minnesota public high school.

Assessment Results
2010 Minnesota Comprehensive Assessment Series II Scores
 63% of students meet or exceed state standards for Science - 12% higher than the state average
 81% of students meet or exceed state standards for Reading - 6% higher than the state average
 39% of students meet or exceed state standards for Math

College Preparation
RWHS offers a variety of Advanced Placement (AP), College in the Schools (CIS), liberal arts and Career and Technical Education programs.

College in the Schools

College in the Schools is a program run by the University of Minnesota that allows high school students to attain college credit while staying in their high school. Columbia University found that students who took dual enrollment courses in high school were more likely to graduate from high school and enroll in college, as well as three years after high school graduation, students who had participated in dual enrollment courses in high school had earned higher college GPAs and more postsecondary credits than their peers.

Research shows that colleges and universities nationwide accept dual enrollment credits at almost the same rate as they accept AP scores, though it greatly depends on the institution from which the credit originated from. College in the Schools dual enrollment through the University of Minnesota is accepted almost universally coast-to-coast.

Once limited to high-achieving students, such programs, specifically College in the Schools, are increasingly seen as a means to support the postsecondary preparation of average-achieving students. CIS simulates a truer college experience, as unlike AP courses, students are already enrolled in a college institution and need only to earn a quality grade throughout the course, rather than the potential for college credit being based solely on the score of a cumulative final exam. The United States Department of Education recommends expanding accelerated learning options that offer true post-secondary course work so that students enter higher education with a minimum of six college credits already earned, as students who fail to earn 20 college credits by the end of their first year were less likely to graduate from college.

There is no charge to high school students attending U of M courses offered by CIS at their high school. The University of Minnesota-TC charges schools or districts tuition based on a per student, per course basis (not per credit). For the 20102011 school year, tuition is $145 per student, per course, and partial reimbursement for these costs is available to public high schools from the state. College in the Schools is significantly less expensive than the full tuition rate the school district or parent pays when a student enrolls full-time PSEO or after graduation.

The University of Minnesota offers over thirty courses through their CIS program, including University Writing, Calculus, American History, Economics, Physiology and several courses in the content areas of World Language and Agricultural Science. College in the School courses offered at RWHS are CIS German and CIS Spanish.

Advanced Placement
Advanced Placement courses are college-level courses taught at RWHS. The Advanced Placement curriculum is offered through a grant earned by Red Wing High School. AP offerings at RWHS include:
AP Biology, AP Chemistry, AP Language & Composition, AP Literature & Composition, AP Calculus, AP Microeconomics, AP Human Geography, AP Art History and AP Studio Art Drawing.

Post-Secondary Enrollment Options (PSEO)
Eligible juniors and seniors at Red Wing High School may enroll at Minnesota post-secondary institutions on a full or part-time basis. A student who takes college or technical courses for high school credit will have the cost of tuition, books and materials paid for by the State of Minnesota. Enrollment options include, but are not limited to: Minnesota State College – Southeast Technical, University Center Rochester (featuring programs from Rochester Community & Technical College (RCTC), University of Minnesota - Rochester and WSU Rochester Center) and the University of Minnesota - Twin Cities.

Articulated Agreements (Tech Prep)
Articulated Agreements are contractual agreements between Red Wing High School and selected post-secondary schools in Minnesota that will provide curricula allowing advanced standing for students in post-secondary technical programs. At Red Wing High School, a junior or senior student earning an "A" or "B" in an Articulated course will receive a certificate indicating the number of credits that will be honored by the technical or community college named on the certificate. Articulated Agreement credits may be earned at Red Wing High School in Agricultural Science, Business and Marketing, Family and consumer science and Industrial Technology.

Athletics, Co-Curricular Activities and Performing Arts

Red Wing competes in the Missota Conference and Region IAA of the Minnesota State High School League. The school colors are purple and white. Uniforms and school logos typically include red as an accent and the sports teams are known as the Red Wing Wingers. Many students recognize purple, red and white as the school colors, but red is only included due to the name of the city. The school's hockey program was started in 1974 by Jim Pohl. Led by John Pohl, the Wingers won the boys' state championship in 1997. John Pohl is second place for the all-time scoring record for Minnesota High School Hockey.

Sports and Activities

Activities and Co-Curricular Organizations

Student Body and Support Groups

Student council

Co-Curricular and Intra-Curricular Organizations

DECA

FFA FFA organizes many events at Red Wing High School including Earth Day, Open House, Poverty Night and the school wide Day of Caring and Sharing, among many more activities.
Health Occupations Students of America (HOSA)
SkillsUSA

Academic and Recognition Activities

Aerie Student Newspaper
Aerie is the Red Wing High School newspaper page that prints roughly 14 issues per school year in the Republican Eagle.
Knowledge Bowl
Knowledge Bowl is an interdisciplinary academic competition involving teams of four to six students trying to answer questions in a written round and several oral rounds.
Speech Competition
Yearbook
The Scarlet Feather is responsible for recording, highlighting and commemorating the past year of school in a book published annually, known as a yearbook.
National Honor Society
S.O.A.R.
S.O.A.R. is an acronym for Success, Opportunity, Achievement and Recognition. It is the goal of the S.O.A.R. program that every student at Red Wing High School has the opportunity for a successful high school career and that every student will be recognized for his/her achievement.

Service Organizations

Interact
Interact is a combination service and social club for young people ages 14 to 18. Each of the over 7,200 Interact clubs around the world is sponsored by a Rotary Club that provides guidance and inspiration. The youth clubs are self-governing and self- supporting, giving Interactors a chance to develop a range of leadership skills while learning the value of good teamwork. Interact stands for international action. International, because Interact clubs exist in 88 countries and 17 geographical areas.
Key Club
Key Club is a year-round service organization, which is sponsored by the local Kiwanis Clubs composed of the leading business and professional people to the community. Key Club's objective is the development of initiative, leadership ability and good citizenship practices.

Performing Arts

Marching Band and Jazz Band
Ovation
Ovation is a co-curricular ensemble of 16 students selected from Concert Choir.
School Musical
Every year Red Wing High School and the Sheldon Theater produce a professional, big-budget musical. The performances occur in the Sheldon Theater, and the stage and costumes are professionally designed. 
Drama/ Theatre
Theatre at Red Wing typically participates in three activities each year.
 Fall play: The fall play is usually a children's play.
 Winter play: The winter play is usually a three-act comedy or classic presented in February of March. 
 One-Act: Minnesota State High School League one act play competition.

Notable alumni
 Patrick John Flueger: Actor, The Princess Diaries, The 4400, Scoundrels and the 2011 remake of the film Footloose. Currently stars in the NBC  series Chicago P.D. (TV series)
 Lauris Norstad, Air Force General, commander Nato forces 
 John Pohl: NHL Player, Toronto Maple Leafs, Chicago Wolves
 Reid Cashman: AHL Player, Toronto Marlies, Wilkes-Barre/Scranton Penguins
 Tim Kelly: Politician, Minnesota House of Representatives
 Vic Kulbitski, American football player
 Ryan Boldt, second round pick in the 2016 MLB Draft by the Tampa Bay Rays
 Mitchell Peters, percussionist, composer and long-time tympanist with the Los Angeles Philharmonic Orchestra
 James Touchi-Peters, composer, symphonic conductor, and jazz vocalist
 Lyle Mehrkens, Minnesota state legislator and farmer
 Taylor Heise, Ice hockey player

Red Wing High School in the News
Red Wing High School has been in the news for multiple reasons. One of them being the school getting sued for a homecoming dress-up day titled "Wangster Day" back in 2009. The lawsuit was filed by a black student who claims more than 70 students showed up to school wearing "african american dress," things like baggy pants, do-rags, and flashy gang symbols. The lawsuit was filed by a student who claimed to go into a "deep depression" over the day. The school was sued for more than $75,000 and was finalized in 2012.

Red Wing High School was in the news again for an event that happened the week of homecoming in 2013. The dress-up day for Monday was called "National Pride Day" so students got to dress up for whichever nationality they wanted to. A group of students wanted the name to originally be "'Merica Monday" but the administration did not find that term correct, so they came up with the new name. A group of about 20 students went to the school late Sunday night and decided to "decorate" the school with window marker, streamers, and mini American flags and went to decorate the grounds for school on Monday. The students put window marker on the front doors of the school saying "Merica" or "USA" they also drew with chalk outside of the school and put the mini American flags throughout the lawn in the front of the school. The students got suspended for a minimum of 2 days.

References

External links 
Official site
Red Wing High School sports
Red Wing Agricultural Science Department

Public high schools in Minnesota
Educational institutions established in 1886
Schools in Goodhue County, Minnesota
Charter schools in Minnesota
Red Wing, Minnesota
1886 establishments in Minnesota